Baron Faringdon, of Buscot Park in the County of Oxfordshire, is a title in the Peerage of the United Kingdom. It was created in 1916 for Sir Alexander Henderson, 1st Baronet, who had previously represented Stafford West and St George's, Hanover Square in the House of Commons as a Liberal Unionist. He had already been created a baronet in 1902. He was succeeded by his grandson, the second Baron. He was the son of the Hon. Harold Henderson, eldest son of the first Baron, who predeceased his father. Lord Faringdon was a member of the London County Council.  the titles are held by his nephew, the third Baron, who succeeded in 1977. He is the son of the Hon. Michael Thomas Handerson, second son of the Hon. Harold Henderson.

The family seat is Buscot Park, near Faringdon, Oxfordshire.

Barons Faringdon (1916)
Alexander Henderson, 1st Baron Faringdon (1850–1934)
Hon. Harold Greenwood Henderson (1875–1922)
Alexander Gavin Henderson, 2nd Baron Faringdon (1902–1977)
Charles Michael Henderson, 3rd Baron Faringdon (b. 1937)

The heir apparent is the present holder's son, the Hon. James Harold Henderson (b. 1961).
The heir apparent's heir apparent is his son, George Alexander Henderson (b. 1992).

Arms

References

Kidd, Charles, Williamson, David (editors). Debrett's Peerage and Baronetage (1990 edition). New York: St Martin's Press, 1990,

External links
"Owners of the Buscot Park Estate," Buscot Park and the Faringdon Collection, The National Trust, accessed 22 March 2013.

Baronies in the Peerage of the United Kingdom
Noble titles created in 1916
Noble titles created for UK MPs